Pieter Mertens (born 28 August 1980) is a Belgian former professional road bicycle racer. He was professional for four years, spending two years at Chocolade Jacques-T Interim between 2004 and 2005 and then two years at UCI ProTeam Predictor-Lotto between 2006 and 2007.

Palmarès 

 Rheinland-Pfalz Rundfahrt - 1 stage (2005)
 Tour de Namur - Overall (2002)

External links 
Personal website
 

Belgian male cyclists
1980 births
Living people
Cyclists from Limburg (Belgium)
People from Lommel